Mount Nesos is the remnants of a volcanic core, over 400 m high, projecting through the ice near the southwest end of White Island, in the Ross Archipelago. Named by the New Zealand Geological Survey Antarctic Expedition (NZGSAE) (1958–59) from the Greek word nesos (nisos), meaning island, and referring to the fact that although isolated by the ice sheet the hill is a part of White Island.

Mountains of the Ross Dependency
White Island (Ross Archipelago)